Zeno Karcz (16 May 1935 – 31 August 2022) was a linebacker in the Canadian Football League.

Having played his junior football with the Windsor AKO Fratmen, he went on to the Hamilton Tiger-Cats (from 1957 to 1966) in the CFL. He was an all star in 1962 and 1965, winning the CFL's Most Outstanding Canadian Award in 1965. He was a member of the 1957, 1963 and 1965 Grey Cup championship teams.

After retiring from professional football, he returned to the Windsor AKO Fratmen as head coach between 1967 and 1969.

References

July 2008 update on Karcz

1935 births
2022 deaths
Canadian people of Polish descent
Canadian Football League Most Outstanding Canadian Award winners
Hamilton Tiger-Cats players
Michigan Wolverines football players
Canadian football people from Toronto
Players of Canadian football from Ontario